Orizaba Nahuatl is a native American language spoken in the southeastern Mexican state of Veracruz mostly in the area to the south of the city of Orizaba. It is also known as Orizaba Aztec and Náhuatl de la Sierra de Zongolica. It has 79 percent intelligibility with Morelos Nahuatl. There is a dialect called Ixhuatlancillo Nahuatl which is spoken in a town to the north of Orizaba. There are several primary schools and one secondary school which use this language along with Spanish.

Phonology

Vowels

Consonants

Writing
The orthography of Orizaba Nahuatl (nlv) is similar to that of Classical Nahuatl (nah), though it features the consonants of this modern variety internationally rather than on the basis of Castilian (Spanish) orthography:
"I will enter his/her house."
"Nicalaquīz īcal." [nah]
"Nikalakīs īkal." [nlv]
This corresponds to a more phonetic translation while still making use of macrons to mark long vowels.
In this orthography the name of the language is Nawatl (as capitalized for English speakers), rather than Nahuatl.
Most grammar and vocabulary changes are minor, most of them corresponding to neologisms and loan words from Spanish.
Example:
"Now/At this moment/Today."
"Āxcān." [nah]
"Axan." [nlv]
(In this case both long vowels and intermediate consonant are lost.)

Some loanwords from Spanish:

Notes

External links

Orizaba Nahuatl lessons

Nahuatl, Orizaba
Nahuatl